Guy Rénard (born 16 March 1934) is a Belgian former sports shooter. He competed at the 1968 Summer Olympics and the 1972 Summer Olympics.

References

External links
 

1934 births
Living people
Belgian male sport shooters
Olympic shooters of Belgium
Shooters at the 1968 Summer Olympics
Shooters at the 1972 Summer Olympics
People from Châtelet
Sportspeople from Hainaut (province)